Alexandra Alexandrovna Mitroshina (born 27 June 1994 in Petrozavodsk), also known as Sasha Mitroshina, is a Russian public figure, writer, journalist, radio host, infojypsy and blogger. She is mostly known as one of founders (together with Alyona Popova) of a social media flash mob against domestic violence in Russia "I did not want to die" (#ЯНеХотелаУмирать).

Biography 
In 2015, Mitroshina graduated from the MSU Faculty of Journalism of Moscow State University, and later from the Department of Communications, Media and Design of the Higher School of Economics in Moscow. Later, she worked and published at Mail.Ru and worked on Radio Moscow FM.

Mitroshina appeared on Instagram in 2016. She now has a blog with more than four million subscribers. Initially being a non-political blogger, Alexandra launched, together with another activist, Alyona Popova, a flash mob "I did not want to die" (hashtag #ЯНеХотелаУмирать) to support women's protests against recent laws which decriminalized domestic violence in Russia.

References

External links 
  
 
 

Russian women writers
Russian journalists
Russian women journalists
Russian radio presenters
Russian women radio presenters
Russian bloggers
Russian women bloggers
Russian feminists
Moscow State University alumni
Living people
1994 births